Charles Burton (1875 – 1948) was a Jamaican cricketer. He played in thirteen first-class matches for the Jamaican cricket team from 1894 to 1906.

See also
 List of Jamaican representative cricketers

References

External links
 

1875 births
1948 deaths
Jamaican cricketers
Jamaica cricketers
Place of birth missing